Jodha Nagri Chak 369 JB  is a village in the Toba Tek Singh district. It is around 7 to 8 km from Gojra on Mongi Bangle/Khidrwala road.

The village is a small settlement in a rural setting. The inhabitants are well educated in this village. The villagers want to improve their village at a fast pace. It is one of the most organized villages in Punjab, Pakistan. Most of the people are working in foreign countries. The Government of Pakistan is providing all the facilities to this village. Jodha Nagri has facilities like a hospital, a school, a poultry farm, water supply, gas supply and is connected to nearby cities and villages with wide roads. There is a food factory that employs the villagers. The people speak two languages namely Punjabi and Urdu. The script Shahmukhi is prevalent.

History 
This village was established by migrants from the Village who moved to this place from a village with the same name Jodha Nagri, now in District Amritsar, East Punjab(India) in the time period between 1880-1890. This was the time when Britishers have established (Sandal Bar) an extensive canal irrigation system and allotted land to farming communities. The land was very fertile and even today is the main source of income of the inhabitants. The people who established this village were mainly from the Sikh community. They lived in this village for odd sixty years. The whole village migrated back to East Punjab at the time of the partition of India in 1947. After that, the land was allotted to the people who have displaced from the present East Punjab (India).

Schools
 Govt. High School for Boys, Jodha Nagri - گورئمنٹ ھا ئی سکول فار بوائز،
 Govt. Girls Primary School, Jodha Nagri - گورئمنٹ  گرلز پرائمری سکول،ہ

Mosque in Chak 369 JB
 مسجد Madni

References 

Villages in Toba Tek Singh District